Following is the list of Members of Parliament in Lok Sabha from Himachal Pradesh.

Present Members

Keys:

See also

List of Rajya Sabha members from Himachal Pradesh

References

Himachal
Lok Sabha members from Himachal Pradesh